Lisa Willner is an American politician from Kentucky. She is a Democrat and represents District 35 in the State House.

References 

Living people
Democratic Party members of the Kentucky House of Representatives
Women state legislators in Kentucky
21st-century American politicians
21st-century American women politicians
Year of birth missing (living people)